Michele Ricciardi (1672 – 1753) was an Italian painter, active in the provinces of Salerno and Avellino, and other towns in the Campania in a late-Baroque-style.

Biography
He was born and died in Penta, a neighborhood of Fisciano in the province of Salerno.  He is described as a follower of Luca Giordano and Francesco Solimena. He mainly painted sacred subjects for churches. He frescoed the interior of the church of Santa Maria delli Mazzi in Coperchia. He depicted the Assumption and the Coronation of the Virgin. He also painted the Virgin with St Lucy and Catherine of Alexandria intercedes with Christ for the town of Coperchia and an Allegory of the Catholic Church.  Around this painting, are twelve smaller paintings likely depicting allegories of the three theological virtues (Faith, Hope and Charity); the four cardinal virtues (Strength, Justice, Temperance, and Prudence); and the eight Beatitudes. He also painted for the Avellino Cathedral.

References

Michele Ricciardi: vita e opere di un pittore campano del Settecento, by Tiziana Mancini, Michele Ricciardi Paparo, 2003.

Italian Baroque painters
17th-century Italian painters
Italian male painters
18th-century Italian painters
1672 births
1753 deaths
People from the Province of Salerno
Painters from Campania
18th-century Italian male artists